The Church of Jesus Christ of Latter-day Saints in Uganda refers to the Church of Jesus Christ of Latter-day Saints (LDS Church) and its members in Uganda. A branch was created in Kampala in 1991, and by year-end 1991, there were 99 members in Uganda. In 2021, there were 18,955 members in 38 congregations.

History

The first Ugandan to join the LDS Church was Charles Osinde, who was baptized in Scotland and returned to Uganda.

The LDS Church was profiled in the Broadway musical The Book of Mormon that premiered in 2011. The story follows two missionaries in Uganda. 

In 2012, The New York Times profiled an LDS Church missionary, Jared Dangerfield, as he served in Uganda, "Each day he rises with the African sun to say his prayers before venturing into the urban wilderness of Kampala, Uganda, a churning kaleidoscope of motorcycles, street urchins, vegetable carts and pterodactyl-like storks that circle office towers and lampposts. They orbit above him as he makes his way up and down the muddy hills of the capital city, careful to keep his black pants and white shirt clean, scanning faces in search of those who will listen to him speak of his faith. His Mormon faith."

Stakes and Districts
As of February 2023, the following stakes and districts were located in Uganda.

Branches not part of a stake or district include:
2 branches in Lira 
2 branches in Mbale
Uganda Kampala Mission Branch

The Uganda Kampala Mission Branch serves families and individuals in Uganda and South Sudan that is not in proximity of a meetinghouse.

Mission
The Uganda Kampala Mission was created in 2005 as a division of the Kenya Nairobi Mission. In 2012, the mission split again creating the Rwanda Kigali Mission.  As of January 2023, the Uganda Kampala Mission remains the only mission of the LDS Church in Uganda and also encomases South Sudan.

South Sudan
The LDS Church has reported no official church membership and congregational figures. Member groups in Juba and Akobo operated starting in 2009 but was discontinued during a civil war in the mid 2010's. All of South Sudan is included in the Uganda Kampala Mission Branch which serves individuals and families not in proximity to a meetinghouse.

Temples
Uganda is currently in the Johannesburg South Africa Temple district. On April 2, 2017, the Nairobi Kenya Temple was announced by Church President Thomas S. Monson.

See also

 Religion in Uganda

References

External links
The Church of Jesus Christ of Latter-day Saints Uganda Newsroom site
The Church of Jesus Christ of Latter-day Saints Official site

Christian denominations in Uganda
Uganda